Maryland's Legislative District 27 is one of 47 districts in the state for the Maryland General Assembly. It covers parts of Calvert County, Charles County and Prince George's County. The district is divided into three sub-districts for the Maryland House of Delegates: District 27A, District 27B and District 27C.

Demographic characteristics
As of the 2020 United States census, the district had a population of 141,454, of whom 109,493 (77.4%) were of voting age. The racial makeup of the district was 67,891 (48.0%) White, 54,779 (38.7%) African American, 684 (0.5%) Native American, 2,935 (2.1%) Asian, 92 (0.1%) Pacific Islander, 4,325 (3.1%) from some other race, and 10,721 (7.6%) from two or more races. Hispanic or Latino of any race were 9,026 (6.4%) of the population.

The district had 106,667 registered voters as of October 17, 2020, of whom 17,732 (16.6%) were registered as unaffiliated, 28,581 (26.8%) were registered as Republicans, 58,641 (55.0%) were registered as Democrats, and 1,196 (1.1%) were registered to other parties.

Political representation
The district is represented for the 2023–2027 legislative term in the State Senate by Michael A. Jackson (D) and in the House of Delegates by Kevin M. Harris (D, District 27A), Jeffrie Long Jr. (D, District 27B) and Mark N. Fisher (R, District 27C).

References

Calvert County, Maryland
Charles County, Maryland
Prince George's County, Maryland
27